The Silver Lining is a 1919 British silent sports film directed by A. E. Coleby and starring Billy Wells, Ella Milne and Richard Buttery. It is set in the world of horseracing.

Cast
 Billy Wells as Jerrold O'Farrell  
 Ella Milne as Pamela Hillsbury  
 Richard Buttery as Jack Hillsbury  
 Warwick Ward as Mark Cathcart 
 Ralph Forster as Sir Thomas Hillsbury  
 George Harrington as Mr. Hamilton  
 Doris Paxman as Sybil Harrington  
 Henry Nicholls-Bates as Mr. Spagnoli  
 Olive Bell as Mrs. Spagnoli

References

Bibliography
 Low, Rachel. The History of British Film: Volume IV, 1918–1929. Routledge, 1997.

External links

1919 films
British horse racing films
British silent feature films
1910s sports films
Films directed by A. E. Coleby
British black-and-white films
1910s English-language films
1910s British films
Silent sports films